Clifford Bernard Starks (born April 25, 1981) is an American mixed martial artist who competes in the Middleweight division for the World Series of Fighting. A professional competitor since 2009, he has formerly competed for the UFC, Bellator, and Shark Fights.

Background
Starks was born in Pomona, California and attended Mountain Pointe High School in Phoenix, Arizona. At Mountain Pointe, Starks competed in wrestling, football, and track and field. Talented, Starks earned a total of ten varsity letters and won a state championship in wrestling. Starks later attended Mesa Community College where he competed in football and track and field until 2002 when he transferred to Arizona State University. At Arizona State, Starks competed for the school's NCAA Division I wrestling team alongside former UFC Heavyweight Champion Cain Velasquez and had a third-place finish in the PAC 10.

Mixed martial arts career

Early career
Starks made his professional MMA debut in 2009 and fought primarily for the Rage in the Cage promotion in Arizona. He quickly amassed an undefeated record of 7-0 during the first two years of his career before joining the UFC.

Ultimate Fighting Championship
Starks made his UFC debut less than two weeks removed from his last fight as a short-notice replacement for injured Brad Tavares against fellow UFC newcomer Dustin Jacoby at UFC 137. He won the fight via unanimous decision (30-27, 30–27, 30–27).

Starks next faced Ed Herman on February 4, 2012, at UFC 143. He lost the fight via submission in the second round.

Starks next faced Yoel Romero on April 20, 2013, at UFC on Fox 7. He lost the fight via KO in the first round and was subsequently released from the promotion.

Bellator MMA
In September 2013, Starks made his debut for Bellator MMA.  He faced Joe Yager at Bellator 100 and won the fight via unanimous decision.

Starks faced Kobe Ortiz on September 26, 2014, at Bellator 126. He won the fight via submission in the second round.

World Series of Fighting
Starks made his debut at WSOF 19. He was originally scheduled to face Eddie Arizmendi on the card.  However, a last minute card change the day of the event led to Starks facing Jake Heun on the main card.  He won the fight via submission in the second round.

Mixed martial arts record

|-
|Loss
|align=center|14–5
|Abdul-Rahman Dzhanaev
|Decision (majority)
|ACB 74: Aguev vs. Townsend
|
|align=center| 3
|align=center| 5:00
|Vienna, Austria
|
|-
| Win
| align=center| 14–4
| Waylon Quotskuyva
| Submission (americana)
| Ringside Unified Fighting 22
| 
| align=center| 1
| align=center| 3:35
| Maricopa, Arizona, United States
| 
|-
| Loss
| align=center| 13–4
| Albert Duraev
| Submission (rear-naked choke)
|ACB 67: Cooper vs. Berkhamov
| 
| align=center| 2
| align=center| 2:34
| Grozny, Russia
| 
|-
| Loss
| align=center| 13–3
| David Branch
| Decision (unanimous)
| WSOF 30
| 
| align=center| 5
| align=center| 5:00
| Las Vegas, Nevada, United States
| 
|-
| Win
| align=center| 13–2
| Krasimir Mladenov
| Decision (unanimous)
| WSOF 23
| 
| align=center| 3
| align=center| 5:00
| Phoenix, Arizona, United States
| 
|-
| Win
| align=center| 12–2
| Mike Kyle
| Decision (unanimous)
| WSOF 22
| 
| align=center| 3
| align=center| 5:00
| Las Vegas, Nevada, United States
| 
|-
| Win
| align=center| 11–2
| Jake Heun
| Submission (arm-triangle choke)
| WSOF 19
| 
| align=center| 2
| align=center| 4:11
| Phoenix, Arizona, United States
| 
|-
| Win
| align=center| 10–2
| Kobe Ortiz
| Technical submission (guillotine choke)
| Bellator 126
| 
| align=center| 2
| align=center| 0:52
| Phoenix, Arizona, United States
| 
|-
| Win
| align=center| 9–2
| Joe Yager
| Decision (unanimous)
| Bellator 100
| 
| align=center| 3
| align=center| 5:00
| Phoenix, Arizona, United States
| 
|-
| Loss
| align=center| 8–2
| Yoel Romero
| KO (flying knee and punches)
| UFC on Fox: Henderson vs. Melendez
| 
| align=center| 1
| align=center| 1:32
| San Jose, California, United States
| 
|-
| Loss
| align=center| 8–1
| Ed Herman
| Submission (rear-naked choke)
| UFC 143
| 
| align=center| 2
| align=center| 1:43
| Las Vegas, Nevada, United States
| 
|-
| Win
| align=center| 8–0
| Dustin Jacoby
| Decision (unanimous)
| UFC 137
| 
| align=center| 3
| align=center| 5:00
| Las Vegas, Nevada, United States
| 
|-
| Win
| align=center| 7–0
| Artenas Young
| Decision (unanimous)
| Shark Fights 20
| 
| align=center| 3
| align=center| 5:00
| Laughlin, Nevada, United States
| 
|-
| Win
| align=center| 6–0
| Rudy Aguilar
| TKO (punches)
| Rage in the Cage 152
| 
| align=center| 1
| align=center| 1:42
| Chandler, Arizona, United States
| 
|-
| Win
| align=center| 5–0
| Roe Harris
| KO (punch)
| Rage in the Cage 151
| 
| align=center| 1
| align=center| 2:59
| Chandler, Arizona, United States
| 
|-
| Win
| align=center| 4–0
| Tony Johnson 
| Decision (unanimous)
| MEZ Sports: Pandemonium 4
| 
| align=center| 3
| align=center| 5:00
| Riverside, California, United States
| 
|-
| Win
| align=center| 3–0
| Mike Heidenreich
| TKO (punches)
| Rage in the Cage 144
| 
| align=center| 1
| align=center| 1:23
| Chandler, Arizona, United States
| 
|-
| Win
| align=center| 2–0
| Reyes Ortiz
| Decision (split)
| Rage in the Cage 139
| 
| align=center| 3
| align=center| 5:00
| Tucson, Arizona, United States
| 
|-
| Win
| align=center| 1–0
| Chad Menneke
| Submission (americana)
| Rage in the Cage 138
| 
| align=center| 2
| align=center| 1:35
| Mesa, Arizona, United States
|

See also
 List of current UFC fighters
 List of male mixed martial artists

References

External links
 
 

American male mixed martial artists
Middleweight mixed martial artists
Mixed martial artists utilizing collegiate wrestling
Living people
1981 births
Ultimate Fighting Championship male fighters
American male sport wrestlers
Amateur wrestlers